John Topp (born 7 March 1952) is a New Zealand cricketer. He played in one first-class match for Wellington in 1978/79.

See also
 List of Wellington representative cricketers

References

External links
 

1952 births
Living people
New Zealand cricketers
Wellington cricketers
Cricketers from Lower Hutt